Comicó is a village, and municipality, in Río Negro Province in Argentina.

References

Populated places in Río Negro Province